'Shaiza Kashyap''' is an Indian actress. She also appeared in Anurag Kashyap Yudh. She recently got listed by the prestigious Forbes magazine under "Forbes India celebrity 100 nominee list 2015", She is the first person under 25 who made it to the list.she works in milan talkies a film by tigmanshu dhulia as kusum 2019

Early life
She is born in Pilakhani, a small district in Sahranpur. She was a professional theatre artist with Bharti Dharma Kshitij Tepertory. Later she joined Kingdom of Dreams as part of Jhumroo.  She was a winner of Miss West Delhi 2012.

 Television 
 PS I Hate You (2014) as Lara
 Ghunghat (2014) as lead
 Dosti... Yaariyan... Manmarziyan'' (2015) as Kritika

References

External links
 

Indian film actresses
Actresses in Hindi cinema
Living people
Year of birth missing (living people)